VW Cephei (VW Cep) is an eclipsing contact binary of W Ursae Majoris-type located roughly at 90.6 light years from the Sun, whose two component stars share a common outer layer. Because the two components share their outer layers, as the components of W Ursae Majoris do, they have the same stellar classification, and are classified as yellow G-type main sequence dwarfs. The components take 0.2783 days (roughly 6.7 hours) to revolve around a common barycentre. Orbital period variations suggest the presence of one more additional perturbing objects of likely low-mass stellar nature.

Unseen companion(s)

Orbital period variations suggest the presence of one more perturbing unseen object around the eclipsing binary. Several publications have tried to set constrains to putative orbital period and minimum mass for unseen component. The most recent article proposes an orbital period of 29.8 years for a stellar object with roughly three fourths the Sun's mass and high orbital eccentricity (e=0.66). Inclination is assumed being 33.6 degrees.
Nevertheless, hints of an additional body in the system still subsist and the authors infer a period of 77.46 years and eccentricity of 0.54 for unseen fourth component. Minimum mass is unclear, tentatively assumed being as small as 0.19 solar masses, as inferred by Pribulla et al. in 2000. In any case orbital solutions are still blurry and further calculations are needed to provide a more robust model.

With the release of Gaia DR2, the presence of any stellar companions was ruled out.

Notes

References

Cepheus (constellation)
Cephei, VW
W Ursae Majoris variables
197433
G-type main-sequence stars
101750
Durchmusterung objects
9703